Clifton Wilson "Hennie" Lemon (April 15, 1901 – November 9, 1955) was an American football end in the National Football League (NFL). Lemon played college football for the Centre Praying Colonels of Centre College, including the 6 to 0 upset of Harvard. Lemon was selected All-Southern in 1922. He played in the NFL for the Chicago Bears.

References

American football ends
Centre Colonels football players
All-Southern college football players
Chicago Bears players
Players of American football from Kentucky
Sportspeople from Paducah, Kentucky
1901 births
1955 deaths